Daníel Bjarnason (born 26 February 1979) is an Icelandic composer and conductor. He has garnered widespread acclaim for his debut album, Processions (2010), with TimeOut NY writing he "create(s) a sound that comes eerily close to defining classical music's undefinable brave new world".

Life and career
Born on 26 February 1979, Daníel studied composition, piano and conducting in Reykjavik, before going on to further study orchestral conducting at the University of Music, Freiburg. He has had a number of works commissioned and debuted by Los Angeles Philharmonic.

Daníel is currently composer-in-residence at the Muziekgebouw Frits Philips, Eindhoven and was artist in residence with Iceland Symphony Orchestra from 2015 to 2018. He has also collaborated with respected artists from many different genres, including Ben Frost, Sigur Ros and Brian Eno.

Various conductors have also performed Daníel's work, including Gustavo Dudamel, John Adams, André de Ridder, James Conlon, Louis Langrée and Ilan Volkov.

Daníel's recent work has included collaborations with the Los Angeles Philharmonic, Rambert Dance Company, Britten Sinfonia, Cincinnati Symphony Orchestra, So Percussion and the Calder Quartet. In August 2017, he acted as a co-curator, composer and conductor at the Los Angeles Philharmonic's Reykjavik Festival.

Awards 
Daníel Bjarnason has won numerous awards at the Icelandic Music Awards, including Song Of The Year (2015) for Ek ken di nag  and Composer of the Year, 2013 for his works The Isle Is Full of Noises and Over Light Earth. Over Light Earth (2013) won the Icelandic Music Award for the best classical CD of the year in 2013. Also in 2013, he and Ben Frost won the Edda Award for best soundtrack for their score to film The Deep, directed by Baltasar Kormákur. In 2010, Daníel nominated for the prestigious Nordic Council's Music Prize, and won the Kraumur Music Award. Daníel has also been awarded a grant from the Kristján Eldjárn Memorial Fund.

Discography

Albums 
 Processions (2010) — Bedroom Community
 Sólaris (with Ben Frost) (2011) — Bedroom Community
 Over Light Earth (2013) — Bedroom Community
 Djúpið (2017) — Bedroom Community

Works

Solo and small chamber works 
 5 Chinese Poems (2001)
 4 Seasons of Yosa Buson (2003)
 Skelja (2006)
 Fanfare for Harpa (2011)
 Four Anachronisms (2012)
 Qui Tollis (2013)
 Ek Ken Die Nag (2014)
 Stillshot (2015)

Ensemble and chamber orchestra 
 All Sounds to Silence Come (2007)
 Over Light Earth (2012)

Orchestra 
 Emergence (2011)
 Blow Bright (2013)
 Collider (2015)
 From Space I Saw Earth for three conductors (2019)

Solo with ensemble/orchestra 
 Solitudes (2003)
 Sleep Variations (2005)
 Processions (2009)
 Bow to String (2010)
 Sólaris (2011)

Chorus 
 Enn Fagnar Heimur (2011)
 Ek Ken Die Nag (2014)

Chorus and orchestra 
 The Isle Is Full of Noises (2012)

Solo voice with ensemble 
 Larkin Songs (2010)

Operas 
 Brothers (2017)

Film scores 
 Reykjavik Guesthouse (2003)
 Come To Harm (2011)
 The Deep (2012)
 Under The Tree (2017)

Music for dance 
 Smáljón í Sjónmáli (2011)
 Frames - Alexander Whitley/Rambert (2015)

Collaborations 
 Efterklang (Arranging for and performing in live project "Efterklang, Daníel Bjarnason and their Messing Orchestra")
 Ben Frost (Sólaris, The Deep)
 :fr:Olivia Pedroli (Arranging for and appearing on albums "The Den" and "A Thin Line")
 Ólöf Arnalds (Arrangements on albums "Við og við" and "Innundir Skinni")
 Hjaltalín (Arranging for and performing in live project "Alpanon" with Iceland Symphony Orchestra)
 Sigur Rós (Arrangements on albums "Valtari" and "Kveikur")

References 

Daniel Bjarnason
Living people
1979 births
Male classical composers
Daniel Bjarnason
Male conductors (music)
21st-century conductors (music)
21st-century male musicians
Daniel Bjarnason
Hochschule für Musik Freiburg alumni